Nkosingiphile Gumede (born 1 December 1993) is a South African soccer player who plays for Golden Arrows as a goalkeeper.

Club career
Gumede is a product of the Golden Arrows youth academy and was promoted to the first-team squad in 2011. He made his debut against Ajax Cape Town in December 2011.

International career
Gumede was called up to the senior South Africa squad for the 2016 COSAFA Cup.

References

1993 births
Living people
Soccer players from Durban
South African soccer players
Association football goalkeepers
Lamontville Golden Arrows F.C. players
South African Premier Division players
National First Division players